Soyo Airport  is an airport serving Soyo, a city in Zaire Province in Angola.

The Soyo non-directional beacon (Ident: SO) is located on the field.

Airlines and destinations

See also
 List of airports in Angola
 Transport in Angola

References

External links
 
 OurAirports - Soyo
 OpenStreetMap - Soyo

Airports in Angola
Soyo